Muzhou or Mu Prefecture (睦州) was a zhou (prefecture) in imperial China centering on modern Jiande, Zhejiang, China. It existed (intermittently) from 603 to 1121, when its name changed to Yanzhou (and eventually to Yanzhou Prefecture in the Ming dynasty).

Geography
The administrative region of Muzhou in the Tang dynasty falls within modern Jiande in western Zhejiang. It probably includes modern:
Jiande
Tonglu County
Chun'an County

See also
Yanzhou Prefecture

References
 

Prefectures of the Sui dynasty
Prefectures of the Tang dynasty
Liangzhe West Circuit
Prefectures of Wuyue
Former prefectures in Zhejiang